The British Light Heavyweight Championship was a top  British wrestling championship found throughout the country's circuit. The title's broken history dates back to the 1920s. After going inactive in 2004, the title was re-activated in 2014.

The championship was recognised and defended on matches screened by UK national television network ITV as part of the professional wrestling slot on World of Sport as well as standalone broadcasts.  Pre-publicity for these championship match broadcasts was given in ITV's nationally published listings magazine TVTimes.

Title history
This is the combined list of different versions of the British Heavyweight Titles, each of which was probably the most significant version at the time. Each version may or may not be connected to another. However, all title changes are either actual or "official" unless indicated otherwise.

Original

All Star Wrestling/ WAW/ RBW

Footnotes

See also

Professional wrestling in the United Kingdom

References

External links
British Light Heavyweight Title

Light heavyweight wrestling championships
National professional wrestling championships
Professional wrestling in the United Kingdom